Fair Republic (Moldovan Cyrillic: Република Жустэ;) is a Transnistrian political party, formed on 3 July 2007 by three members of the Supreme Council. The party claims to be a left-wing opposition party.

At the founding congress on 3 July 2007 the lawyer Yuriy Gervasyuk, member of the Transnistrian parliament was elected as chairman of the party. Galina Antyufeyeva, the chairperson of the parliamentary legislative committee and wife of security minister Vladimir Antyufeyev, also joined "Fair Pridnestrovie" as well as Valeri Ponomarenko. Ponomarenko is a newly elected member of the Transnistrian parliament, who stood as independent candidate against Igor Smirnov's daughter-in-law, Marina Smirnova, in a by-election in June 2007.

The party works closely with the Russian political party Fair Russia, and which Gervasyuk stated "is ready to cooperate and support its Pridnestrovian colleagues." The party intends to combine socialism with patriotism and is in favor of an independent Transnistria.

External links 
 Tiraspol Times: Trans-Dniester gets its 10th political party
 RIA New Region: Party "Fair Republic" created in Transnistria

Political parties in Transnistria
Political parties established in 2007
Russian political parties in Moldova